The 34th Infantry Division is an infantry division of the United States Army, part of the National Guard, that participated in World War I, World War II and multiple current conflicts. It was the first American division deployed to Europe in World War II, where it fought with great distinction in the Italian Campaign.

The division was deactivated in 1945, and the 47th "Viking" Infantry Division was later created in the division's former area. In 1991 the 47th Division was redesignated the 34th. Since 2001, division soldiers have served on homeland security duties in the continental United States, in Afghanistan, and in Iraq. The 34th has also been deployed to support peacekeeping efforts in the former Yugoslavia and elsewhere.

The division continues to serve today, with most of the division part of the Minnesota and Iowa National Guard. In 2011, it was staffed by roughly 6,500 soldiers from the Minnesota National Guard, 2,900 from the Iowa National Guard, about 300 from the Nebraska National Guard, and about 100 from other states.

World War I
The division was established as the 34th Division of the National Guard in August 1917, consisting of units from Iowa, Minnesota, Nebraska, North Dakota, and South Dakota. On 25 August 1917, it was placed under the command of Maj. Gen. Augustus P. Blocksom, who was succeeded by Brig. Gen. Frank G. Mauldin briefly on 18 September 1917, but was back in command by 10 December 1917.

The division initially included the 67th Infantry Brigade, formed in August 1917 in the Iowa and Nebraska National Guards and the 68th Infantry Brigade. The 67th Brigade comprised the 133rd Infantry Regiment and the 134th Infantry Regiment. The 68th Brigade comprised the 135th Infantry Regiment and the 136th Infantry Regiment. A controversy arose when Brigadier General Frederick Emil Resche, a native of Germany who had long resided in Duluth, was accused of anti-American sentiments. No evidence was forthcoming, but Resche was still relieved of command, supposedly for inefficiency.

The division takes its name from the shoulder sleeve insignia designed for a 1917 training camp contest by American regionalist artist Marvin Cone, who was then a soldier enlisted in the unit. Cone's design evoked the desert training grounds of Camp Cody, New Mexico, by superimposing a red steer skull over a black Mexican water jug called an "olla." In World War I, the unit was called the "Sandstorm Division." German troops in World War II, however, called the U.S. division's soldiers "Red Devils" and "Red Bulls," the division later officially adopted the divisional nickname Red Bulls.

Brig. Gen. Frank G. Mauldin took command. The 34th Division arrived in France in October 1918, but it was too late for the division to be sent to the front, as the end of hostilities was near, with the Armistice with Germany being signed the following month.

Brig. Gen. John Alexander Johnston took command 26 October 1918, and some personnel were sent to other units to support their final operations. Charles Dudley Rhodes took command in December and led the division until its departure for the United States in January 1919. The 34th was disbanded on 18 February 1919 at Camp Grant, Illinois.

World War I order of battle
Units of the 34th Division during World War I included:
 Headquarters, 34th Division
 67th Infantry Brigade (Headquarters, 1st Brigade, Iowa National Guard)
 133rd Infantry Regiment (1st Iowa Infantry, Troop C, 1st Iowa Cavalry, Machine Gun Company, 4th Nebraska Infantry, 3rd Battalion, 2nd Iowa Infantry, and Separate Company, Iowa Infantry)
 134th Infantry Regiment (5th Nebraska Infantry)
 126th Machine Gun Battalion (2nd Battalion, 2nd Iowa Infantry and Machine Gun Company, 6th Nebraska Infantry)
 68th Infantry Brigade (Headquarters, Minnesota National Guard Brigade)
 135th Infantry Regiment (1st Minnesota Infantry)
 136th Infantry Regiment (2nd Minnesota Infantry)
 127th Machine Gun Battalion (2nd Squadron, South Dakota Cavalry and individual transfers from 1st Squadron, South Dakota Cavalry)
 59th Field Artillery Brigade
 125th Field Artillery Regiment (75 mm) (3rd Minnesota Infantry, less Machine Gun Company)
 126th Field Artillery Regiment (75 mm) (1st Iowa Field Artillery)
 127th Field Artillery Regiment (155 mm) (4th Nebraska Infantry, less Machine Gun Company)
 109th Trench Mortar Battery (Headquarters Company less band, Supply Company, and Machine Gun Company, 2nd Iowa Infantry)
 125th Machine Gun Battalion (Troop B, 1st Iowa Cavalry, Machine Gun Company, 3rd Minnesota Infantry, and 1st Battalion, 2nd Iowa Infantry)
 109th Engineer Regiment (1st Separate Battalion Iowa Engineers, Sanitary Detachment, 2nd Iowa Infantry, Headquarters Company (less band), Supply Company, and 2nd Battalion, 6th Nebraska Infantry)
 109th Field Signal Battalion (Company C, Iowa Signal Corps, and Company B, Nebraska Signal Corps)
 Headquarters Troop, 34th Division (Troop A, 1st Iowa Cavalry)
 109th Train Headquarters and Military Police (1st Battalion, 6th Nebraska Infantry, less Company D)
 109th Ammunition Train (Iowa ammunition train, Troop D, 1st Iowa Cavalry)
 109th Supply Train (3rd Battalion, less Company I, 6th Nebraska Infantry)
 109th Engineer Train (Company I, 6th Nebraska Infantry)
 109th Sanitary Train
133rd, 134th, 135th, and 136th Ambulance Companies and Field Hospitals (1st and 2nd Iowa Ambulance Companies, 1st Minnesota Ambulance Company, 1st and 2nd Iowa Field Hospitals, 1st Minnesota Field Hospital, ad 1st North Dakota Field Hospital)

Between the world wars 
The units of the 34th Division returned to their home stations and reverted to their state designations, to prepare for the reorganization of the National Guard in the early 1920s. On 17 January 1921, the Observation Squadron, Minnesota National Guard, was the first National Guard observation squadron to receive federal recognition. Per War Department naming conventions, the squadron was re-designated the 109th Observation Squadron on 25 January 1923.

Per the National Defense Act of 1920, the 34th Division was allotted the states of Iowa, Minnesota, North Dakota, and South Dakota, and assigned to the VII Corps in 1921. War Department policy mandated that National Guard division headquarters could not be organized and federally recognized until 75 percent of their intended subordinate units had been organized and federally recognized; the headquarters of the 34th Division was organized and federally recognized on 14 July 1924.

On 16 May 1934, the truck driver's union initiated a strike (Minneapolis Teamsters Strike of 1934), which quickly degenerated into open violence in the streets of Minneapolis. Minnesota Governor Floyd B. Olson activated the National Guard and 4,000 guardsmen to suppress the chaos. Utilizing roving patrols, curfews, and security details, the 34th quickly restored order, thus enabling negotiated settlement of the labor dispute.

On 18 June 1939, a tornado hit Anoka, Minnesota, and Governor Harold E. Stassen called on the Guard again. 300 Guardsmen patrolled the streets and imposed a quasi-martial law while the community was stabilized.

Order of battle, 1939

 Headquarters, 34th Division (Council Bluffs, Iowa)
 Headquarters, Special Troops (Council Bluffs, Iowa)
 Headquarters Company (Council Bluffs, Iowa)
 34th Military Police Company (Aitkin, Minnesota)
 34th Signal Company (Watertown, South Dakota)
 109th Ordnance Company (Medium) (Minnesota National Guard)
 34th Tank Company (Light) (Brainerd, Minnesota)
 67th Infantry Brigade (Des Moines, Iowa)
 133rd Infantry Regiment (Sioux City, Iowa)
 168th Infantry Regiment (Council Bluffs, Iowa)
 68th Infantry Brigade (Valley City, North Dakota)
 135th Infantry Regiment (Minneapolis, Minnesota)
 164th Infantry Regiment (Fargo, North Dakota)
 59th Field Artillery Brigade (Minneapolis, Minnesota)
 109th Ammunition Train (Minnesota National Guard)
 125th Field Artillery Regiment (Duluth, Minnesota)
 151st Field Artillery Regiment (Minneapolis, Minnesota)
 185th Field Artillery Regiment (Davenport, Iowa)
 109th Engineer Regiment (Rapid City, South Dakota)
 136th Medical Regiment (Ames, Iowa)
 109th Quartermaster Regiment (Osceola, Iowa)

Italics indicates state of headquarters allocation; headquarters not organized or inactive.

Prelude to World War II 
The expanding war in Europe threatened to draw a reluctant United States into the conflict. As the potential of U.S. involvement in World War II became more evident, initial steps were taken to prepare troops what for lay ahead through "precautionary training." The division was deemed one of the most service-ready units, and Ellard A. Walsh was promoted to major general in June 1940, and then succeeded to division commander in August, following month-long command tours intended to honor senior generals Lloyd D. Ross (Iowa), George E. Leach (Minnesota), and David S. Ritchie (North Dakota) before their retirements.

The Selective Training and Service Act of 1940 was signed into law 16 September, and the first conscription in U.S. history during peacetime commenced.

The 34th was subsequently federalized on 10 February 1941, with troops from North Dakota, South Dakota, Minnesota, and Iowa. The division was transported by rail and truck convoys to the newly constructed Camp Claiborne in Rapides Parish, Louisiana near Alexandria.

The soldiers started rigorous training including maneuvers in Alexandria starting 7 April 1941. The climate during the summer was especially harsh. The division then participated in what became known as the Louisiana Maneuvers, and became a well-disciplined, high-spirited, and well-prepared unit.

In the early phase of the maneuvers, General Walsh, who suffered from chronic ulcers, became too ill to continue in command, and was replaced by Major General Russell P. Hartle on 5 August 1941.

World War II

Order of battle
Headquarters, 34th Infantry Division
133rd Infantry Regiment
100th Infantry Battalion (replacing 133d's 2nd Bn, left in England)
135th Infantry Regiment
168th Infantry Regiment
 Headquarters and Headquarters Battery, 34th Infantry Division Artillery
 125th Field Artillery Battalion (125th FAB) (105 mm)
 151st Field Artillery Battalion (151st FAB) (105 mm)
 175th Field Artillery Battalion (175th FAB) (105 mm)
 185th Field Artillery Battalion (185th FAB) (155 mm)
 109th Engineer Combat Battalion (109th ECB)
 109th Medical Battalion
 34th Cavalry Reconnaissance Troop (34th CRT) (Mechanized)
 Headquarters, Special Troops, 34th Infantry Division
 Headquarters Company, 34th Infantry Division
 734th Ordnance Light Maintenance Company (734th OLMC)
 34th Quartermaster Company
 34th Signal Company
 Military Police Platoon
 Band
 34th Counterintelligence Corps Detachment (34th CCD)

In common with other U.S. Army divisions during World War II the 34th was reorganized from a square to a triangular division before seeing combat. The division's three infantry regiments became the 133rd, 135th, and 168th Infantry Regiments, together with supporting units.

Combat chronicle
On 8 January 1942, the 34th Division was transported by train to Fort Dix, New Jersey to quickly prepare for overseas movement. The first contingent embarked at Brooklyn on 14 January 1942 and sailed from New York the next day. The initial group of 4,508 men stepped ashore at 12:15 hrs on 26 January 1942 at Dufferin Quay, Belfast, Northern Ireland. They were met by a delegation including the Governor (Duke of Abercorn), the Prime Minister of Northern Ireland (J. M. Andrews), the Commander of British Troops Northern Ireland (Lieutenant General Sir Harold Franklyn), and the Secretary of State for Air (Sir Archibald Sinclair). Private First Class Milburn H. Henke, Company B, 133rd Infantry Regiment, of Hutchinson, Minnesota, was honorarily selected as the "first" American soldier to set foot in the United Kingdom during the Second World War. 

While in Northern Ireland, Hartle was tasked with organizing an American version of the British Commandos, a group of small "hit and run" forces, and promoted his aide-de-camp, Captain William Orlando Darby to lead the new unit. Darby assembled volunteers, and of the first 500 U.S. Army Rangers, 281 came from the 34th Infantry Division. On 20 May 1942, Hartle was designated commanding general of V Corps and Major General Charles Ryder, a distinguished veteran of World War I, took command of the 34th Division. The division trained in Northern Ireland until it boarded ships to travel to North Africa for Operation Torch, the Allied invasion of North Africa, in November 1942.

The 34th, under command of Major General Ryder, saw its first combat in French Algeria on 8 November 1942. As a member of the Eastern Task Force, which included two brigades of the British 78th Infantry Division, and two British Commando units, they landed at Algiers and seized the port and outlying airfields. Elements of the 34th Division took part in numerous subsequent engagements in Tunisia during the Allied build-up, notably at Sened Station, Sidi Bou Zid and Faid Pass, Sbeitla, and Fondouk Gap. In April 1943 the division assaulted Hill 609, capturing it on 1 May 1943, and then drove through Chouigui Pass to Tebourba and Ferryville. The Battle of Tunisia was won, and the Axis forces surrendered.

The division skipped the Allied invasion of Sicily (Operation Husky) and instead trained intensively for the invasion of the Italian mainland, with the main landings being at Salerno (Operation Avalanche) on 9 September 1943, D-Day, to be undertaken by elements of the U.S. Fifth Army, commanded by Lieutenant General Mark Clark. The 151st Field Artillery Battalion went in on D-Day, 9 September, landing at Salerno, while the rest of the division followed on 25 September. 

2nd Battalion, 133nd Infantry Regiment, had been left behind to provide security for Allied installations in England, and the segregated Japanese-American 100th Infantry Battalion would be attached to replace their 2nd Battalion in North Africa, travelling with them to Italy.

Engaging the enemy at the Calore River, 28 September, the 34th, as part of the VI Corps under Major General John Lucas, relentlessly drove north to take Benevento, crossed the winding Volturno three times in October and November, assaulted Monte Patano, and took one of its four peaks before being relieved on 8 December.

In January 1944, the division was back on the front line battering the Bernhardt Line defenses. Persevering through bitter fighting along the Mignano Gap, the 34th used goat herds to clear the minefields. The 34th took Monte Trocchio without resistance as the German defenders withdrew to the main prepared defenses of the Gustav Line. On 24 January 1944, during the First Battle of Monte Cassino they pushed across the Gari River into the hills behind and attacked Monastery Hill which dominated the town of Monte Cassino. While they nearly captured the objective, in the end their attacks on the monastery and the town failed. The performance of the 34th Infantry Division in the mountains has been called one of the finest feats of arms carried out by any soldiers during the war. The unit sustained severe losses. In the 133rd Infantry, the 100th Battalion, attached in place of the 2nd Battalion, had only 7 officers and 78 men remaining in its rifle companies. In the 135th Infantry, there was an average of only 30 men in each rifle company. The 1st Battalion, 168th Infantry, had only 154 combat effective men, the 2nd Battalion had 393, and the 3rd Battalion had 246. They were relieved from their positions 11–13 February 1944. Eventually, it took the combined force of five Allied infantry divisions to finish what the 34th nearly accomplished on its own.

After rest and rehabilitation, the 34th Division landed at the Anzio beachhead 25 March 1944. The division maintained defensive positions until the offensive of 23 May, when it broke out of the beachhead, took Cisterna, and raced to Civitavecchia and the Italian capital of Rome. After a short rest, the division, now commanded by Major General Charles Bolte, drove across the Cecina River to liberate Livorno, 19 July 1944, and continued on to take Monte Belmonte in October during the fighting on the Gothic Line. Digging in south of Bologna for the winter, the 34th manned the line opposite the German 65th Infantry Division. The Red Bull Division jumped off as part of the Spring 1945 offensive in Italy, 15 April 1945, and captured Bologna on 21 April after hard fighting against the 65th. Pursuit of the routed enemy to the French border was halted on 2 May upon the German surrender in Italy and the end of World War II in Europe.

On 27 June 1944 the 16th SS-Panzer Grenadiers command post in San Vincenzo, Italy was overrun by the 1st Battalion of the 133rd Infantry Regiment. The command post was a town center apartment which had been commandeered, when the owners returned to their apartment they found a signed large leather-bound Stieler's Hand Atlas which had been left behind.

The division participated in six major Army campaigns in North Africa and Italy. The division is credited with amassing 517 days of front-line combat, second only to the 654 days of fighting by the 32nd Infantry Division. One or more 34th Division units were engaged in actual combat for 611 days.

Unit history
Activated: 10 February 1941 (National Guard Division from North Dakota, South Dakota, Iowa, Minnesota)
Overseas: May 1942
Days of combat: 517
 Distinguished Unit Citations: 3
Awards:
 Medals of Honor: 11
 Distinguished Service Crosses: 98
 Distinguished Service Medals: 1
 Silver Stars: 1,153
 Bronze Stars: 2,545
 Legions of Merit: 116
 Soldier's Medals: 54
 Purple Hearts: 15,000
Foreign awards:
French Croix de Guerre
Casualties:
Killed in action: 2,866
Wounded in action: 11,545
Missing in action: 622
Prisoner of war: 1,368
Total battle casualties: 16,401
Commanders:
Major General Ellard A. Walsh (February–August 1941)
Major General Russell P. Hartle (August 1941 – May 1942)
Major General Charles W. Ryder (May 1942 – July 1944)
Major General Charles L. Bolte (July 1944 to inactivation)
Returned to U.S.: 3 November 1945
Inactivated: 3 November 1945
Reorganized in Iowa
Major General Ray C. Fountain (19 Nov 1946 – 31 Aug 1954)
Major General Warren C. Wood (1 Sept 1954 – 30 Nov 1962)
Major General Frank P. Williams (1 Dec 1962 – 31 Dec 1967)
Inactivated: 1968

Cold War to 2001
The 34th was inactivated on 3 November 1945. The division was reformed within the Iowa and Nebraska National Guards in 1946–7.

Order of battle, 1948

Headquarters, 34th Infantry Division (Iowa, Nebraska)
133rd Infantry Regiment (Iowa)
134th Infantry Regiment (Nebraska)
168th Infantry Regiment (Iowa)
 Headquarters and Headquarters Battery, 34th Infantry Division Artillery (Iowa)
 554th Field Artillery Battalion (105 mm) (Iowa)
 556th Field Artillery Battalion (105 mm) (Iowa)
 568th Field Artillery Battalion (105 mm) (Nebraska)
 185th Field Artillery Battalion (155 mm) (Iowa)
 Headquarters, Special Troops, 34th Infantry Division (Iowa)
 Headquarters Company, 34th Infantry Division (Iowa)
 734th Ordnance Maintenance Company (Nebraska)
 34th Quartermaster Company (Nebraska)
 34th Signal Company (Iowa)
 34th Military Police Company (Iowa)
 34th Infantry Division Band (Iowa)
 128th Engineer Combat Battalion (Nebraska)
 109th Medical Battalion (Iowa)
 34th Mechanized Cavalry Reconnaissance Troop (Iowa)

In 1960 its units comprised the 1 BG-133 Inf, 2 BG-133 Inf, 1 BG-134 Inf, 2 BG 134 Inf, 1 BG-168 Inf, 1st and 2nd Bns 168th Arty, 1st, 2nd, 3rd, and 4th Battalions 185th Arty, 1st Bn 133rd Armor, 2nd Squadron 133rd Armor (Cav), 734th Ord Bn, 128th Engineer Battalion, 109th Med Bn, 234th Signal Bn, 234th Transportation Battalion, 34th QM Co., 34th Avn Co, 34th Admin Co., 34th Aircraft Maintenance Detachment.

It disbanded again in 1963, being replaced in part by the 67th Infantry Brigade. It also retained its Division HQ as a Command HQ to supervise training of combat and support units in the former division area for some years. The 47th Infantry Division was headquartered at St Paul, MN, by 1963, as the National Guard division covering the former 34th's area.

The division was reactivated as a National Guard division (renaming the 47th Division) for Minnesota and Iowa on 10 February 1991 upon the fiftieth anniversary of its federal activation for World War II. At that point the division transitioned into a medium division, with a required strength of 18,062 soldiers.

In 2000 the Minnesota Legislature renamed all of Interstate 35 in Minnesota the "34th Division (Red Bull) Highway," in honor of the division and its service in the World Wars.

Twenty-first century

Shortly after its rebirth in 1991, the division began a process of reorganization and change that has continued to the present. One of the most significant developments was transformation from its old brigade structure into brigade combat teams and the broadening of its multi-state base. The Arden Hills-based 34th Red Bull Infantry Division provides command and control for 23,000 Citizen-Soldiers in eight different states. In Minnesota the 34th ID includes the 1st Armored Brigade Combat Team, 34th Combat Aviation Brigade, 84th Troop Command and the 347th Regional Support Group. Known as the Red Bulls, the 34th Infantry Division is capable of deploying its Main Command Post, Tactical Command Post, and Division Headquarters and Headquarters Battalion to provide command and control for Army brigades.

Outside Minnesota, the 34th Infantry Division provides training and operational guidance to the 1–112th Security & Support Battalion, ND National Guard; 1–183rd Aviation Battalion, Idaho National Guard; 1–189th Aviation Battalion, Mont. National Guard; 115th Fires Brigade, Wyo. National Guard; 116th Heavy Brigade Combat Team, Idaho National Guard; 141st Maneuver Enhancement Brigade, ND National Guard; 157th Maneuver Enhancement Brigade, Wis. National Guard; 196th Maneuver Enhancement Brigade, SD National Guard; 2nd Brigade Combat Team, Iowa National Guard; and the 32nd Infantry Brigade Combat Team, Wis. National Guard. Combined, the division represents 23,000 Citizen-Soldiers in units stationed across eight different states.

Since October 2001, division personnel served in Operation Joint Forge in Bosnia and Herzegovina and Operation Joint Guardian in Kosovo. Other deployments during the same time period have included Operation Vigilant Hammer in Europe, the Mediterranean Theater of Operations, and Egypt, and Joint Task Force Bravo – Honduras.

The 34th Infantry Division has deployed approximately 11,000 soldiers on operations since October 2001. At home this has included troops deployed for Operation Noble Eagle; abroad, units and individual soldiers have deployed to Afghanistan and Iraq.

Afghanistan
2004  In May 2004, the 1st Battalion, 168th Infantry Regiment (augmented by Company D, 2nd Battalion, 135th Infantry Regiment), 2nd Brigade, 34th Infantry Division, and with nearly 100 key positions filled by members of the 1st Battalion (Ironman), 133rd Infantry Regiment, 2nd Brigade, 34th Infantry Division, commenced combat operations at 13 Provincial Reconstruction Team sites throughout Afghanistan as part of Operation Enduring Freedom, returning the 34th Infantry Division to combat after 59 years and becoming first unit in the division to wear the Red Bull patch as a right-shoulder combat patch since World War II. The 2011 book Words in the Dust by former 34th ID soldier Trent Reedy is a novel based on the experiences of the 34th ID soldiers assigned to the Farah, Afghanistan PRT.
2010  In August 2010, nearly 3,000 Iowa National Guard soldiers, with 28 hometown send-offs, left for a year-long deployment to Afghanistan, making it the largest deployment of the Iowa National Guard since World War II. Augmented by the 1–134th Cavalry Reconnaissance and Surveillance Squadron of the Nebraska National Guard, the brigade conducted pre-mobilization training in Mississippi and California. The troops partnered with Afghan security forces to provide security and assist in training.

Iraq

2003–2005 In November 2003, 34th ID's own D 216 ADA from Monticello, MN was activated for deployment in support of Operation Iraqi Freedom. From November 2003 through March 2004, the battery trained under the 81st Enhanced Separate Brigade (Armored) in preparation for the deployment at Ft. Lewis, Yakima Training Center, and Ft. Irwin/National Training Center (NTC). While training at NTC, D 216 ADA was reassigned to the 1st CAV, 2nd BCT, 4/5 ADA. In March 2004, the unit moved to Camp New York in Kuwait, then convoyed northward to Baghdad in early April 2004. From April 2004 through March 2005, the Battery performed a wide range of missions to quell a growing insurgency and secure areas of Baghdad ahead of Iraq's first elections. These missions included securing neighborhoods adjacent to Route Irish, maintaining a QRF force for Route Irish, conduct combat operations across a 100 km2 area in the vicinity of Al Radwaniyah Presidential Complex (RPC), and gate/perimeter security across several locations on the perimeter of Victory Base Complex (VBC). In recognition of D 216 ADA's exemplary service, the unit was awarded the Valorous Unit Award.

2004–2006 In November and December 2004, two platoons of the 634th Military Intelligence Battalion of the 34th Infantry Division activated to train and deploy as AAI RQ-7 Shadow Unmanned Aerial Vehicle operators. The two platoons provided near real time video reconnaissance supporting units from various locations in northern Iraq from the Iran to the Syrian borders. The First platoon received an award for being one of the best shadow units in the army for their safe flight record and mission effectiveness. The units were activated for over 20 months spending only 12 in Iraq.
2005 In January 2005, Company A, 1st Battalion, 194th Armor Regiment (1/194 AR) arrived at Camp Ashraf (about 80 km north of Baghdad) to conduct security and convoy operations in the surrounding area and conducted joint operations with Iraqi Army ahead of the October 2005 Iraqi constitution ratification vote. The 151-man unit was formed from nearly all of the soldiers in the 1/194th and Company A was chosen to honor the unit's lineage of the soldiers who fought to defend the Philippines against the Japanese and the Bataan Death March that followed. The unit was awarded the Meritorious Unit Commendation for its exceptional service.
2006  In March 2006, 1st Brigade, 34th Infantry Division commenced combat operations in central and southern Iraq as part of Operation Iraqi Freedom, marking the largest single unit deployment for the 34th since World War II. Returning in July 2007, 1st Brigade served one of the longest consecutive combat operations by a United States National Guard unit (activated for 22 months total with 16 in Iraq). In an effort to recreate the Living Red Bull Patch from Camp Cody, NM, in 1918, the 1st Brigade made its own Living Patch on the parade field at Camp Shelby, MS prior to its deployment to Iraq for OIF 06–08. On 16 July 2009, three members of the Fighting Red Bulls were killed in Basra, Iraq.
2008–2009 More than 700 34th Combat Aviation Brigade soldiers deployed to Iraq and Afghanistan.
2009–2010 The 34th Red Bull Infantry Division deployed more than 1,200 soldiers to Basra, Iraq where they provided command and control for 16,000 U.S. military members and oversaw operations in nine of Iraq's 18 provinces. The highest-ranking suicide in Iraq occurred during this time. It was a Major and an officer of the 34ID.
2010 The Saint Cloud-based B, 2nd General Support Aviation Battalion, 211th Aviation Regiment, departed in November for a deployment in support of Operation New Dawn. Flying CH-47 Chinook cargo helicopters, the Company B mission is to provide aerial movement of troops, equipment and supplies for support of maneuver, combat and combat service support operations.
2011  In June 2011, 1st Brigade deployed to Kuwait, supplying troops for Operation New Dawn. The brigade was augmented with 1–180th Cavalry and 1–160th Field Artillery from the Oklahoma National Guard as well as the 112th Military Police Battalion from the Mississippi National Guard.
2013 Personnel from the 34th Infantry Division participated in the exercise Talisman Saber to collectively train within the U.S. Pacific Command Theater of Operations. Division Headquarters personnel focused on offensive and defensive operations while fostering relationships with I Corps, U.S. Army Pacific and the Australian Defence Forces.

United States 

 2019 In May, the 34th Combat Aviation Brigade provided CH-47 and UH-60 helicopters and personnel to local government agencies to fight and contain three wildfires in northwest Minnesota. 
 2019 In June, the 34th DIV participated in a full-spectrum Warfighter Exercise with the 40th Infantry Division at Fort Leavenworth. During this exercise, the brigade staff was able to successfully integrate with different levels of command and adjacent units.

Kuwait 
 2013 The 34th Combat Aviation Brigade welcomed home the St. Cloud-based Company C, 2nd General Support Aviation Battalion, 211th Aviation Regiment from a deployment in support of Operation Enduring Freedom where they conducted more than 650 medical evacuation missions and flew 1,700 accident-free flight hours. The company also received six new CH-47F Chinook helicopters and trained more than 30 personnel in their operation.

Current structure 

34th Infantry Division exercises training and readiness oversight of the following elements, but they are not organic and include a division headquarters battalion, one armored brigade combat team, two infantry brigade combat teams, a cavalry brigade combat team, a field artillery brigade, and several attached units—specifically a field artillery brigade, a maneuver enhancement brigade, and a regional support group—along with Companies A and B from the 2nd Battalion 123rd Armor Regiment in the Kentucky Army National Guard:
  34th Infantry Division Headquarters and Headquarters Battalion
 1st Armored Brigade Combat Team (ABCT) (MN NG)
 Headquarters and Headquarters Company (HHC), 1st ABCT 
  1st Squadron, 94th Cavalry Regiment (Armored Reconnaissance)
  1st Battalion, 145th Armor Regiment
  1st Battalion, 194th Armor Regiment
  2nd Battalion, 136th Infantry Regiment
  1st Battalion, 125th Field Artillery Regiment (FAR)
  334th Brigade Engineer Battalion (BEB)
  134th Brigade Support Battalion (BSB)
 2nd Infantry Brigade Combat Team (IBCT) (IA NG)
 HHC, 2d IBCT
  1st Squadron, 113th Cavalry Regiment, Reconnaissance Surveillance and Target Acquisition (RSTA) (IA NG)
  1st Battalion, 133rd Infantry Regiment (IA NG)
  1st Battalion, 168th Infantry Regiment (IA NG)
  2nd Battalion, 135th Infantry Regiment
  1st Battalion, 194th Field Artillery Regiment
  224th BEB
  334th BSB
  32nd IBCT (WI NG)
 HHC, 32d IBCT
  1st Squadron, 105th Cavalry Regiment, RSTA
  1st Battalion, 128th Infantry Regiment
  2nd Battalion, 127th Infantry Regiment
  3rd Battalion, 126th Infantry Regiment
  1st Battalion, 120th FAR
  173rd BEB
  132nd BSB
  116th Cavalry Brigade Combat Team (CBCT) (ID NG)
  HHC, 116th CBCT (ID NG)
  1st Squadron, 221st Cavalry Regiment (Armored Reconnaissance) (NV NG)
  1st Squadron, 163rd Cavalry Regiment (Combined Arms) (MT NG)
  2nd Squadron, 116th Cavalry Regiment (Combined Arms) (ID NG)
  3rd Squadron, 116th Cavalry Regiment (Combined Arms) (OR NG)
  1st Battalion, 148th FAR (ID NG)
  116th BEB
  145th BSB (ID NG)
  Combat Aviation Brigade (CAB) (MN NG)
 HHC, Combat Aviation Brigade
  1st Battalion, 112th Aviation Regiment (Support & Security) (ND NG)
  2nd Battalion, 147th Aviation Regiment (Assault) (MN NG)
  1st Battalion, 183rd Aviation Regiment (Attack) (ID NG)
  1st Battalion, 189th Aviation Regiment (General Support) (MT NG) 
  834th Aviation Support Battalion (ASB) (MN NG)
 34th Infantry Division Artillery - to activate fall of 2022

Attached units 
  115th Field Artillery Brigade (WY NG)
 1st Battalion, 121st FAR (WI NG)
 1st Battalion, 147th FAR SD NG)
 1st Battalion, 151st FAR (MN NG)
 2nd Battalion, 300th FAR (WY NG)
 960th BSB (WY NG)
 148th Signal Company (WY NG)
  157th Maneuver Enhancement Brigade (WI NG)
 347th Regional Support Group (RSG) (formerly 34th Division Support Command)
 HHC, 347th RSG
 147th Personnel Services Battalion
 347th Personnel Services Detachment
 34th Military Police Company (MPC)
 257th MPC
 114th Transportation Company
 204th Medical Company
 247th Finance Detachment
  34th Infantry Division Band
  Service Battery, 1st Battalion, 214th FAR (GA NG)
 Companies A and B, 2nd Battalion, 123rd Armor Regiment (KY NG)

Commanders
Major General David H. Lueck
Major General Clayton A Hovda
Major General Gerald A. Miller
Major General Rodney R. Hannula
Major General Larry Shellito
Major General Rick D. Erlandson
Major General Richard C. Nash
Major General David Elicerio
Major General Neal Loidolt
Major General Jon Jensen
Major General Benjamin Corell
Major General Michael Wickman
Major General Charles Kemper

Popular culture
in the 1965 film version of James Clavell's 1962 novel King Rat, George Segal's character, U.S. Army Corporal King, wears the shoulder patch of the 34th Infantry Division. This is inaccurate, due to the Division having seen action in North Africa and Italy, not the Southwest Pacific or China-Burma-India Theater.

References

Bibliography

External links 

 
 
 
 
 
 
 
 
 
 
 
 
 
 

034th Infantry Division, U.S.
Infantry Division, U.S. 034
Divisions of the United States Army National Guard
United States Army divisions of World War I
Military units and formations in Minnesota
Military units and formations in Iowa
Infantry divisions of the United States Army in World War II
Military units and formations established in 1917